The second season of reality singing television competition Idol Philippines premiered on June 25, 2022 on Kapamilya Channel, A2Z and TV5 aired until its season finale on September 18, 2022. It was the first season to not air on ABS-CBN after the network was ordered by the National Telecommunications Commission (NTC) and Solicitor General Jose Calida to cease and desist its free-to-air television and radio broadcast operations on May 5, 2020, following the expiration of its congressional franchise.

The season was hosted by Robi Domingo, who replaced Billy Crawford as host following his departure from the network. Regine Velasquez and Moira Dela Torre returned to the judging panel, being joined by new judges Gary Valenciano and Chito Miranda.

Khimo Gumatay of Makati emerged as the winner, winning an exclusive recording contract from ABS-CBN Music, as well as a ₱1,000,000 cash prize. Ryssi Avila of Bacoor, Cavite finished as the runner-up with Kice finishing in third place.

Overview

Development 
The second season was first confirmed during the final episode of the first season, although the fate of the season was left uncertain after the National Telecommunications Commission and Solicitor General Jose Calida issued a cease and desist order on ABS-CBN, effectively ceasing free-to-air broadcasting operations on the network. Its aftermath, including the denial of the franchise, layoffs and loss of frequencies saw the transfer of host Billy Crawford and director Bobet Vidanes to blocktimer shows that are aired on TV5. However, it was announced on April 25, 2022 that the show would continue its return. Auditions for the season opened the following day.

Broadcast 
The second season airs on Kapamilya Channel and A2Z at 7:00pm every weekend, taking over the timeslot left by the tenth season of reality show Pinoy Big Brother, which aired its last post-season special on June 19, 2022. In addition, TV5 also airs the season, marking the first time the network aired an iteration of the Idol franchise since Philippine Idol in 2006. TV5 airs the season at 8:30pm on Saturdays and 9:00pm on Sundays, taking over the timeslot left by the second season of reality singing competition Masked Singer Pilipinas, which aired its finale on June 18, 2022.

Online companion show 
An online show, titled The Next Idol PH, aired on the show's UpLive account and on Kapamilya Online Live during commercial breaks. Hosted by the show's former contestants; Anji Salvacion, Matty Juniosa, Enzo Almario, Lucas Garcia, Gello Marquez, Fana and Shanaia Gomez. The show airs live via Zoom from the hosts' respective places at the time of the show's broadcast (prior to the Live gala), or from the Idol Philippines studio (during the Live gala). The show usually interviews the season's contestants following their performances on the show's broadcast.

Sponsorships 
The show partnered with video social media platform UpLive, which hosted the show's online auditions. The platform also aired the show's online companion show, The Next Idol PH, which is hosted by the show's former contestants.

Prizes 
The winner of the season received an exclusive recording contract from ABS-CBN Music, well as a ₱1,000,000 cash prize. They also received a franchise from Dermacare and a house and lot from Camella Homes worth ₱2,500,000.

Marketing
Idol Philippines launched its own non-fungible token (NFT) collection featuring the show's logo, tickets, and the likeness of the contestants as part of a promotion. It became the first-ever Philippine television program to launch its own NFT collection.

Judges and host

On May 20, 2022, during a broadcast of news program TV Patrol, the roster of judges for the season was revealed. Of the four judges from the previous season, only Regine Velasquez and Moira Dela Torre returned, marking the departure of James Reid and Vice Ganda from the judging panel. The two departing judges were replaced by singer-songwriter Gary Valenciano and Parokya ni Edgar frontman Chito Miranda. Two days later, on a launch party on ASAP Natin 'To!, it was announced that Robi Domingo will be the new host, replacing Billy Crawford who left for blocktimer shows on other networks.

Comedian Ogie Diaz later revealed that Vice Ganda backed out from the show after receiving word that Sarah Geronimo was initially slated to be a judge for the show but backed out due to her personal responsibilities. Meanwhile, James Reid was unable to return for the season as he resided abroad at the time of the season in order to pursue an international career.

Auditions
The initial auditions for the season opened on April 25, 2022 for Idol hopefuls aged 16 to 28 years old. Due to the restrictions implemented in response to the COVID-19 pandemic on the Philippines, all initial auditions were held online, eliminating the open-call audition process that was widely used for the previous season. Those selected by the producers to audition in front of the judges performed at the ABS-CBN Studio in Quezon City, wherein an auditionee must receive at least three "yes" votes from the judges in order to advance and receive a golden ticket to Idol City. Occasionally, a judge may opt to award a platinum ticket, rather than a usual golden ticket.

At the start of the season premiere, former contestants Anji Salvacion, Gello Marquez, Shanaia Gomez, Fana, iDolls members Matty Juniosa, Enzo Almario and season 1 runner-up Lucas Garcia performed a rendition of Andra Day's "Rise Up". Throughout the course of the auditions, a total of 72 Idol hopefuls have received a ticket to Idol City, four of which have received a platinum ticket. However, some auditions were unaired due to undisclosed reasons. .

Platinum ticket 
This season introduced the Platinum Ticket. Derived from the platinum ticket first introduced in the twentieth season of American Idol, a platinum ticket would allow its recipient to directly advance to the solo round of the Middle Rounds. The judges are given one chance to award a platinum ticket to a contestant of their choice. Only one judge is allowed to award a ticket per audition.

Competition summary
Color key

Middle rounds
The middle rounds were held at the ABS-CBN studios in Quezon City. This stage is composed of three rounds—the Group, Do or Die, and Solo rounds. At the end of these rounds, twelve contestants will be left to compete for the title of Idol Philippines.

Color key:

Group round
The golden ticket holders were divided into fourteen groups named by its respective members. Each group selected a song to perform from a wall containing several song titles. Following a group's performance, the judges will choose an indefinite number of contestants to advance to the next round. The first performances of the Group round were aired on the latter half of Episode 12, which aired on July 31, 2022. At the end of the group rounds, forty-four contestants remained.

Do or Die round
The remaining contestants were grouped by the judges and was also assigned a song to perform as a group. Like in the previous round, the judges will choose an indefinite number of contestants to advance to the next round at the end of each performance. The round aired on August 7, 2022.  At the end of this round, twenty contestants remained.

Solo round (Top 20) 
The remaining twenty contestants, including the four platinum ticket holders will perform individually with a song of their choosing. The round aired on August 13 and 14, 2022. Twelve contestants were selected by the judges to advance to the next round. Three of four platinum ticket holders were eliminated in this round.

Live gala 
The Top 12 will perform each week live on air.  At the end of the performances, viewers may vote for a contestant of their choice. For this season, viewers may only vote via UpLive. In a mechanic unique to Idol Philippines, the judges will determine half of the contestants' overall scores. The contestant with the highest tally per component will receive a score of 50% from that component, with the rest of the contestants' score being proportionate of the tally of the highest vote-getter. The components are then combined to form the contestant's final score. At the end of each week, one to two contestants are eliminated following the reveal of a bottom three or bottom two.

Week 1: Top 12 – Hugot 
The theme for this week was "hugot", as such the Top 12 performed ballads. The contestants were mentored by former ASAP Sessionistas members Nina and Ice Seguerra. Moira Dela Torre was absent from the episode due to testing positive for COVID-19.

Week 2: Top 10 – Songs of Ogie Alcasid 
For this week, the Top 10 performed the songs sung or written by Ogie Alcasid. The contestants were mentored by Alcasid, himself.

Week 3: Top 8 – Teleserye and Movie Theme Songs 
The Top 8 performed theme songs from Philippine television drama series and movies. This week featured Angeline Quinto as the guest mentor.

Week 4: Top 6 – Showstoppers 
The Top 6 hopefuls performed "showstopping" songs of their choice. The contestants were mentored by musical directors Louie Ocampo and Ria Osorio.

Week 5: The Final Showdown (September 17 & 18)

Part 1 – Top 5 (September 17) 
The Top 5 finalists performed live on September 17, 2022. Two contestants were eliminated in this night, with the remaining three finalists facing off in the following night.

Part 2 – Top 3 (September 18) 
The Top 3 performed live on September 18, 2022. They each performed two songs: a song of their choosing which reflects their journey throughout the competition, and an original song written for them.

The voting for the winner opened following all six performances and were closed closed thereafter. Khimo Gumatay was named the winner, with Ryssi Avila and Kice finishing in second and third respectively; the scores were revealed at the end of the episode.

Elimination chart 
Color key

Accolades

References

Notes 

Idols (franchise)
2022 Philippine television seasons